The Bastrop Advertiser is a weekly newspaper covering Bastrop, Texas, and wider Bastrop County. Founded in 1853, it is one of the oldest continually operating weeklies in the state of Texas; and along with papers like the Elgin Courier, is considered the newspaper of record for some of the small rural towns in the Greater Austin region.

References

External links
 Official website

Bastrop County, Texas